Domino Records may refer to:

Domino Records (1916), American producer of early phonograph, from 1916 to 1917
Domino Records (1924), American record label, from 1924 to 1933
Domino Records (Canada), produced by the Compo Company in the 1920s and 1930s which usually leased their recordings from Plaza Music Company and its successor American Record Corporation
Domino Records (1950), American R&B regional label from New York City produced by René Hall
Domino Records (1957), American regional record label from Austin, Texas, from 1957 to 1961
Domino Recording Company, British independent record label formed in 1993